George Shuldham Hume (4 March 1800 – 25 November 1872) was an English first-class cricketer who played for Cambridge University in two matches in 1821, totalling 165 runs with a highest score of 97 not out.

Hume was educated at Eton College and King's College, Cambridge. After graduating he became a Church of England priest and was vicar of Melksham (with Seend, Erlestoke and Shaw) from 1825 until his death.

References

Bibliography
 

1800 births
1872 deaths
People educated at Eton College
Alumni of King's College, Cambridge
English cricketers
English cricketers of 1787 to 1825
Cambridge University cricketers
19th-century English Anglican priests